Governor Phipps, or Phips, may refer to

George Phipps, 2nd Marquess of Normanby (1819–1890), Colonial Governor of Nova Scotia, Queensland, New Zealand and Victoria between 1838 and 1863
Spencer Phips (1685–1757), Acting Governor of the Province of Massachusetts Bay from 1749 to 1753 and from 1756 to 1757
William Phips (1651–1695), Governor of the Province of Massachusetts Bay from 1692 to 1694
William Phipps (Governor of Bombay) (died 1748), Governor of Bombay from 1722 to 1729